Weberton Correia dos Santos (born July 26, 1990) is a Brazilian football player.

Club statistics

References
j-league

1990 births
Living people
Brazilian footballers
Brazilian expatriate footballers
J2 League players
Ventforet Kofu players
Expatriate footballers in Japan
Association football defenders